Batumi RC is a Georgian semi-professional rugby club from Batumi, who plays in the Didi 10, the first division of Georgian rugby and from the 2022 season they will have a professional team in the Rugby Europe Super Cup.

Current squad 
2019/2020 squad

}

Honors
Georgia Championship
 1999, 2002, 2019, 2022

See also
:Category:Batumi RC players

External links
Batumi

 

Rugby union teams from Georgia (country)
Rugby clubs established in 1969
Sport in Batumi
1969 establishments in the Soviet Union
Rugby Europe Super Cup